Xue Ruipeng (born 1988-03-20 in Taiyuan, Shanxi) is a Chinese swimmer, who competed for Team China at the 2008 Summer Olympics. Currently coaching for the national swimming squad of Hong Kong.

Major achievements
2005 East Asian Games - 2nd 200m breast
2008 National Champions Tournament - 1st 200m breast

References
http://2008teamchina.olympic.cn/index.php/personview/personsen/5373

1988 births
Living people
Chinese male breaststroke swimmers
Swimmers from Shanxi
Olympic swimmers of China
Sportspeople from Taiyuan
Swimmers at the 2008 Summer Olympics
Asian Games medalists in swimming
Swimmers at the 2010 Asian Games
Asian Games silver medalists for China
Medalists at the 2010 Asian Games